The 1913 Philadelphia Phillies season was a season in American baseball. It involved the Phillies competing in the National League and finishing in second place.

Off season
On January 15, 1913 it was announced that Pittsburgh Pirates secretary William H. Locke had purchased the Phillies. Locke became the new team president, his cousin, former New York City Police Commissioner William F. Baker assumed the role of Vice President, and his father-in-law Daniel C. Snyder became the club's secretary-treasurer.

Regular season 

The Phillies started out with high hopes. They led the National League on June 25 with a 38–17 record. As the Athletics were dominating the American League, the two teams appeared well on their way to meeting in the World Series. But the Phillies lost 13 of their next 16 games to fall into second place, and never recovered. 1913 would mark the closest that the A's and Phillies ever got to meeting in the World Series before the former team moved west. On August 14, 1913, owner William H. Locke died in Ventnor, New Jersey after a long illness. Two months later his widow would sell her shares to William F. Baker, who became the new team president.

Season standings

Record vs. opponents

Notable transactions 
 August 29, 1913: Dan Howley and $10,000 were traded by the Phillies to the Montreal Royals for Ed Burns.

Roster

Player stats

Batting

Starters by position 
Note: Pos = Position; G = Games played; AB = At bats; H = Hits; Avg. = Batting average; HR = Home runs; RBI = Runs batted in

Other batters 
Note: G = Games played; AB = At bats; H = Hits; Avg. = Batting average; HR = Home runs; RBI = Runs batted in

Pitching

Starting pitchers 
Note: G = Games pitched; IP = Innings pitched; W = Wins; L = Losses; ERA = Earned run average; SO = Strikeouts

Other pitchers 
Note: G = Games pitched; IP = Innings pitched; W = Wins; L = Losses; ERA = Earned run average; SO = Strikeouts

Relief pitchers 
Note: G = Games pitched; W = Wins; L = Losses; SV = Saves; ERA = Earned run average; SO = Strikeouts

Post-season 
In a postseason exhibition game against the Chicago Leland Giants, Cyclone Joe Williams defeated Grover Cleveland Alexander and the Phillies.

Notes

References 
1913 Philadelphia Phillies season at Baseball Reference

Philadelphia Phillies seasons
Philadelphia Phillies season
Philly